Prairie Township is an inactive township in Montgomery County, in the U.S. state of Missouri.

Prairie Township was established in 1818, and named for the prairie within its borders.

References

Townships in Missouri
Townships in Montgomery County, Missouri